Eagle Oil and Shipping Company was a United Kingdom merchant shipping company that operated oil tankers between the Gulf of Mexico and the UK. Weetman Pearson, 1st Viscount Cowdray founded it as the Eagle Oil Transport Company in 1912 and sold it to Royal Dutch Shell in 1919. It was renamed Eagle Oil and Shipping Company in about 1930, and remained a separate company within the Royal Dutch Shell group until it was absorbed in 1959.

Pearson oil interests in Mexico

Sir Weetman Pearson, Bart. (ennobled as Viscount Cowdray in 1910) headed a successful civil engineering contractor, S. Pearson and Sons, that had contracts in Mexico from 1889. He initiated oil prospecting there in 1901 and founded the Mexican Eagle Petroleum Company in 1909, which had its first major oil strike in 1910 (near Tampico on the Gulf of Mexico coast).

Before Pearson struck oil, he started to order oil tankers to carry the oil that he hoped to produce. Armstrong Whitworth on the River Tyne launched San Cristobal (2,041 tons) in 1906 and Swan Hunter, also on Tyneside, launched San Antonio (5,251 tons) in 1909. Pearson also bought James Brand (3,907 tons), which had been built by Armstrong Whitworth in 1893, and renamed her San Bernardo.

Eagle Oil Transport Company
In 1912 Pearson founded the Eagle Oil Transport Company in the UK to take over his ships and carry Mexican Eagle's products. He also founded the Anglo-Mexican Petroleum Company in the UK to sell Mexican Eagle's products outside Mexico.

Eagle Oil Transport immediately ordered 20 modern steam tankers at a cost of £3 million. The company gave all the ships the Spanish names of Christian saints, most of them ending in "o". William Doxford & Sons launched San Jeronimo (12,398 tons), San Nazario (12,029 tons) and San Zeferino (6,433 tons) in 1914.

Eagle Oil Transport suffered significant war losses in the First World War. On 3 August 1914 San Wilfrido struck a mine and sank off Cuxhaven in the North Sea, making her the first merchant ship sunk in the First World War. German submarines torpedoed and sank San Hilario in April 1917 and San Urbano and San Onofre in May 1917, all in the North Atlantic to the west of Ireland. In 1915 the company had bought a dry cargo steamship, Drumlanrig, which was renamed . In December 1917 the German submarine   torpedoed and sank Santa Amalia in the North Atlantic to the west of Islay, with the loss of 43 officers and crew. San Zeferino was damaged by enemy action during the war.

Eagle Oil Transport had at least one motor tanker by the end of the War;  (1,137 tons), which had been launched in 1918 by Short Brothers of Sunderland. The company continued to buy new steam tankers until at least 1928, when J.L. Thompson and Sons launched San Casto (2,446 tons) on the River Wear and Armstrong Whitworth launched San Claudio (2,712 tons).

In 1919 Viscount Cowdray sold his group of oil companies to Royal Dutch Shell. Eagle Oil Transport renewed and expanded its fleet, and some of the new ships were very large by the standards of the day.

Eagle Oil also bought new medium-sized tankers. Swan Hunter built the War Standard Type Z tanker War Kookri (5,582 tons) for the UK Shipping Controller, but when she was launched in 1919 Cowdray bought her and renamed her San Zotico. Cowdray then turned to the US for new ships of this size. Standard Shipbuilding Company of Shooters Island, New York launched San Teodoro (6,137 tons),  (5,995 tons) and San Ubaldo (5,999 tons) in 1921.

After 1921 Cowdray reverted to UK shipyards. Armstrong Whitworth launched San Roberto (5,890 tons) and San Rosendo (5,891 tons) in 1922, San Quirino (5,843 tons) in 1923 and San Salvador (5,805 tons) in 1924.

In 1927 San Fraterno was wrecked on a rock at Bonet Island in the Strait of Magellan and in 1929 San Dunstano was wrecked at the entrance to Tampico harbour.

In about 1930 the Eagle Oil Transport Company was renamed the Eagle Oil and Shipping Company. New additions continued until 1939, when Lithgows launched San Eliseo (8,042 tons), Harland and Wolff launched  (8,071 tons) and Furness Shipbuilding launched  (8,078 tons).

Eagle Oil and Shipping was registered in the United Kingdom. Therefore, after 1938 although the Mexican government had nationalised Mexican Eagle Petroleum, Eagle Oil and Shipping remained a subsidiary of Royal Dutch Shell. After 1938 the fleet continued to carry oil from the Gulf of Mexico to the UK. During the Second World War the company played an important role in supplying petroleum and petroleum products to the United Kingdom. Oil tankers were a particular target in Germany's economic warfare against the Allies. Enemy action sank 17 Eagle Oil ships, killing at least 206 officers, men and DEMS gunners.

 (8,018 tons) was launched by Lithgows on the Clyde in 1937. On 2 December 1939 she struck a mine off the Tongue Lightship in the Thames Estuary and sank with the loss of six men. On 4 May 1940 San Tiburcio struck a mine and sank in the North Sea off the Moray Firth.

San Casimiro was captured off Cape Race, Newfoundland  by the German battleship Gneisenau on 15 March 1941 and scuttled off the Azores five days later. San Conrado was bombed and sunk by enemy aircraft off The Smalls on the coast of west Wales on 1 April 1941.

 (8,073 tons), which Blythswood had launched at Port Glasgow in 1938, became famous for surviving a naval bombardment by the German heavy cruiser Admiral Scheer in 1940. San Demetrios crew succeeded in extinguishing the resultant fire and bringing the ship and her cargo of aviation spirit to Glasgow, Scotland. San Demetrio was repaired and returned to service, but the  torpedoed and sank her in the western Atlantic off Virginia on 17 March 1942 with the loss of 19 lives.

On 2 October 1941  torpedoed and sank San Florentino north of the Azores with the loss of 22 lives. On 31 January 1942 U-107 torpedoed and sank San Arcadio north of Bermuda with the loss of 41 lives. On 31 March 1942  torpedoed and sank San Gerardo off the eastern coast of the US with the loss of 51 lives. On 9 April 1942  torpedoed and sank  (8,072 tons) in the North Atlantic off Cape Hatteras, USA with the loss of 28 lives. On 17 May 1942  torpedoed and sank San Demetrios sister ship  in the eastern Caribbean southwest of Grenada with the loss of 52 lives. On 27 August 1942  torpedoed and sank San Fabian between Jamaica and the Dominican Republic in the Caribbean with the loss of 26 lives.

In 1942 the Ministry of War Transport placed the Empire ships ,  and  under Eagle Oil and Shipping's management. In 1943 two U-boats torpedoed and sank Empire Norseman (9,811 tons) in the Atlantic south of the Azores. After the Second World War the company bought Empire Airman and Empire Cobbett from the ministry, renamed them San Wenceslao and San Wilfrido respectively and kept them in service until 1959.

During the war Eagle Oil and Shipping bought several new tankers to replace war losses. Harland and Wolff launched San Veronico (8,198 tons) and San Vulframo (8,167 tons) in 1942 and San Vito (8,163 tons) in 1943. Hawthorn Leslie launched San Venancio (8,152 tons) in 1942 and San Velino (8,210 tons) in 1944. After the War, Eagle Oil bought two US-built T2 tankers: Bryce Canyon in 1948 and Laurel Hill in 1949. The company renamed them San Leonardo and San Leopoldo respectively and kept them in service until 1961.

Between 1950 and 1960 Eagle Oil acquired at least 16 new tankers. Two of the earliest were a second San Salvador (10,802 tons) and a second San Silvestre (10,953 tons), both launched by Furness Shipbuilding in 1950. Later ships included  (12,278 tons) and San Fortunato (12,257 tons), both launched in 1956 by Cammell Laird on the River Mersey.

In April 1958 a Douglas B-26 Invader bomber aircraft, painted black and with no markings, bombed and sank San Flaviano in Balikpapan Harbour, Borneo, killing two of her crew. The aircraft, its bombs and its pilot, William H. Beale, were sent by the CIA as part of US covert support for the Permesta rebellion in North Sulawesi. UK Prime Minister Harold Macmillan and Foreign Secretary Selwyn Lloyd supported the US policy to supply Permesta and on 6 May 1958, more than a week after the CIA sank San Flaviano, Lloyd secretly told US Secretary of State John Foster Dulles that this was still his position. On 18 May, Indonesian forces shot down a different Permesta B-26 and captured its CIA pilot, Allen Pope. Nevertheless, in June 1958 both Indonesia and the UK publicly claimed that the aircraft had been flown by Indonesian rebels, concealing the CIA involvement of which both governments were well aware. The CIA pilots had orders to target commercial shipping in order to frighten foreign merchant ships away from Indonesian waters, thereby weakening the Indonesian economy and destabilising the Indonesian government of President Sukarno. In this they were at least partly successful: Royal Dutch Shell suspended its tanker service to Balikpapan and evacuated shore-based wives and families to Singapore.

Several new ships delivered to Eagle Oil in the later 1950s were in the order of 18,000 to 19,500 tons. One of the last new ships to be delivered for the fleet was also one of the largest; the second  (34,750 tons), launched by Furness Shipbuilding in 1960. By then Royal Dutch Shell had absorbed Eagle Oil and Shipping, which ceased to be a separate member of the group in 1959.

Fleet List 

 San Dunstano (1912-29). 6,220 tonnes, 3,962n, 420' 2" x 54' 6". Triple expansion steam engines by the shipbuilders.

Completed by Swan Hunter & Wigham Richardson Ltd., Newcastle in July 1912. 

Sank off Tampico after being in a collision with a submerged object while inward bound on 13th October 1929.

 San Eduardo (1912-34). 6,225 tonnes, 3959n, 420' 3" x 54' 7". Triple expansion steam engines by the shipbuilders

Completed by Swan Hunter & Wigham Richardson Ltd., Newcastle in December 1912

Torpedoed off Stornoway but it was quickly towed in and repaired for service on 10th March 1917

Arrived at Port Glasgow to be scrapped by Smith & Houston Ltd in 1934.

 San Fraterno (1913-27). 9,587 tonnes, 6053n. 527' 4" x 66' 8". Quadruple expansion steam engines by the Wallsend Slipway Co. Ltd.

Completed by Swan Hunter & Wigham Richardson Ltd., Newcastle in April 1913.

Mined in the Firth of Forth and beached on the 11th February 1917, later to be repaired and returned to service.

Sank in the Straits of Magellan on 29th July 1927 after striking a rock off of Carlos Island while on passage from Buenos Aires to San Pedro.

 San Ricardo (1913-39). 6465 tonnes, 3927n, 420' 1" x 54' 8". Quadruple exapansion steam engines by the Wallsend Slipway Co. Ltd..

Completed by Armstrong Whitworth & Co. Ltd., Newcastle in June 1913.

Seized by the Mexican Government in 1939 and transferred to Petroleos Mexicanos S.A., where it was renamed to "18 de Marzo".

Scrapping commenced in May 1964 in Astilleros de Veracruz, Veracruz

Notes

Sources

External links
 

British companies established in 1912
Defunct shipping companies of the United Kingdom
Former Shell plc subsidiaries
Joint ventures
Transport companies established in 1912
Transport companies disestablished in 1959
1912 establishments in England
1919 mergers and acquisitions
British companies disestablished in 1959